George Floyd (19732020) was an African-American man who was murdered during a police arrest in Minneapolis.

George Floyd may also refer to:

People 

 George Floyd (American football) (born 1960), American football player
 George Rogers Clark Floyd (18101895), American politician and businessman

Places 
 George Floyd Square, a street intersection in the U.S. city of Minneapolis named for the murdered African-American man

See also 

 George Floyd Duckett (18111902), English army officer, antiquarian, and lexicographer
 
 George Lloyd (disambiguation), a similar name of identical etymology